State Highway 202 (SH 202) is a short highway in Otero County, Colorado. SH 202's western terminus is at County Route 16 (CR 16) where it continues west as CR FF west of Rocky Ford, and the eastern terminus is at U.S. Route 50 (US 50) and SH 71 in Rocky Ford.

Route description
SH 202 begins at the intersection with County Road 16 and County Road FF. It heads east, crossing two waterways, the Catlin and Otero canals, The road then passes through a mix of rural housing and farmland before entering the city limits of Rocky Ford and turning north toward the intersection of South Second Street and Walnut Avenue.

The route then travels north along Second Street for two blocks, crossing a line of the BNSF Railway before intersecting Elm Street, a one-way street which carries eastbound US 50 and southbound SH 71. SH 202 heads to the northeast for two blocks along Second Street and intersects Swink Avenue, the opposite one-way direction of US 50 and SH 71, where the state highway ends.

Major intersections

See also

 List of state highways in Colorado

References

External links

202
Transportation in Otero County, Colorado